Johan Sigurd Karlsen (5 May 1894 – 11 June 1967) was a Norwegian politician for the Labour Party.

He was born in Fredrikstad.

He was elected to the Norwegian Parliament from Sør-Trøndelag in 1954, and was re-elected on two occasions.

Karlsen was mayor of Strinda municipality for a brief time in 1945, and deputy mayor from 1945–1947.

References

1894 births
1967 deaths
Labour Party (Norway) politicians
Members of the Storting
Mayors of places in Sør-Trøndelag
Politicians from Trondheim
People from Fredrikstad
Place of death missing
20th-century Norwegian politicians